Gary O'Kane (born 23 January 1970 in Dunloy, County Antrim, Northern Ireland) is an Irish retired sportsperson.  He played hurling with his local club Dunloy and was a member of the Antrim senior inter-county team in the 1980s and 1990s.

References

1970 births
Living people
Dunloy hurlers
Antrim inter-county hurlers
Ulster inter-provincial hurlers
Hurling managers